Ernest A. Mancini is an American geologist.  He is currently Professor Emeritus and previously Distinguished Research Professor of geology at University of Alabama.

References

Living people
University of Alabama faculty
American geologists
Texas A&M University faculty
Texas A&M University alumni
Year of birth missing (living people)